Lutsk urban territorial hromada is a hromada (municipality) located in Volyn Oblast, in western Ukraine. The hromada's administrative centre is the city of Lutsk.

The hromada was established in 2019, as an amalgamated hromada.

Settlements 
In addition to one city (Lutsk) and one urban-type settlement (Rokyni), there are 34 villages in the hromada:

References 

2019 establishments in Ukraine
Hromadas of Volyn Oblast